William H. Sharpley (December 2, 1854 – December 5, 1928) was an American politician who served as the mayor of Denver, Colorado from 1915 to 1916. He died of heart disease in 1928.

References

External links

Colorado Democrats
Mayors of Denver
1854 births
1928 deaths